Roman Kierpacz (born 5 February 1961 in Siemianowice Śląskie) is a Polish former wrestler who competed in the 1980 Summer Olympics and in the 1988 Summer Olympics.

References

1961 births
Living people
Olympic wrestlers of Poland
Wrestlers at the 1980 Summer Olympics
Wrestlers at the 1988 Summer Olympics
Polish male sport wrestlers
People from Siemianowice Śląskie
Sportspeople from Silesian Voivodeship